Roseivirga echinicomitans is a species of Gram-negative bacteria that belongs to the family Flammeovirgaceae. It is a strictly aerobic, heterotrophic , pink-pigmented, non-motile bacterium from the genus Roseivirga. It was first isolated from the sea urchin Strongylocentrotus intermedius.

R. echinicomitans is an aerobic bacterium that is capable of degrading a variety of organic compounds. Its cells are long, slender, and have a filamentous shape. The bacteria produce pink-pigmented colonies on marine agar.

The ecology and role of R. echinicomitans in marine environments is not well understood, but it has been suggested that it may play a role in the decomposition of organic matter in marine sediments.

The genome of R. echinicomitans has been sequenced and analyzed, providing insights into the bacterium's metabolism and adaptation to its environment.

References

External links
Type strain of Roseivirga echinicomitans at BacDive -  the Bacterial Diversity Metadatabase

Cytophagia
Bacteria described in 2005